Makambako is a medium-sized town and district in the Njombe Region of the Tanzanian Southern Highlands, located roughly 40 miles north of Njombe city by road. It is located at junction of the A104 and B4 roads between Njombe, Iringa, and Mbeya. Its population according to the 2002 Tanzanian census was 51,049.

History
Makambako was visited by Paul Theroux who in his book Dark Star Safari: Overland from Cairo to Cape Town described it not as a town but "a collection of hovels on stretch of paved road where idle people sat or stood."

The town of Makambako has seen fast development.  As a result, the northwest Wabena are advocating for Makambako to become its own district.

Geography
Makambako is now a town, located in the Southern Highlands of Tanzania, approximately 60 kilometers north of the district capital of Njombe. The town of Makambako contains the settlements of Ikwete, Maguvani, Ubena, Kipagamo, Idofi, Mlowa, Mkolango, Lyamkena, Kiumba, Mwembetogwa, Mjimwema, Kitisi, Kivavi and Kilimahewa.

The Makambako Plateau is one of three agroecological zones in the Njombe District, the other two being the Eastern Highlands and the Njombe Plateau.

Maize is commonly grown in the plateau while Makambako is notable for tomato cultivation and trade.

Culture

Ethnic groups
The largest ethnic group in Makambako town are the Bena.  Their living arrangements include large, polygamous, extended families and on average, there are more than five children in a household.  Farming responsibility is left to women with almost all of them following an occupation. Female headed households are more dependent on subsistence food, operating as "street vendors" or with mobile fast-food kitchens.

Language
The residents speak Kisovi a variation of Kibena.

Education
There are several educational institutions in Makambako including primary schools, secondary schools and one university. Some of these include primary schools like Azimio Primary School,  Makambako primary School, Maendeleo primary school, Uhuru primary school, Umoja primary school, also secondary schools like Makambako secondary school, Lyamkena secondary school, Maguvani secondary school, Kipagamo secondary school, Naboti secondary school, genesis secondary school, Mcf-Makambako Girls Secondary School, Ngogo secondary school, Mukilima secondary school. Also there is one university named St. Joseph University of Tanzania.

Health services
Under the Archdiocese of Songea, there are two health services dispensaries in Makambako District, the Makambako Dispensary in the town of Makambako and the Kitanewa Dispensary in the town of Kitanewa. The Makambako Parish is run by the Benedictine Sisters, Congregation of Saint Agnes, Saint Bikire Maria wa Huruma.

Transportation

Road
The 322 kilometres road between Songea and Makambako was funded by the ADB and was built between 1980 and 1985. There is a regular quick bus service.
The trunk road between Tanzania and Zambia (Tan-Zam Road), founded by The World Bank and completed in 1973, goes through the district.

Railway
Makambako lies along the TAZARA Railway. The bridge section of the railway in Makambako was said to have been completed in early 1973.

Public works
Makambako is a major centre for rural planning in the region and contains a Rural Service Centre, where thousands of plots have been surveyed and allocated to developers.  Councillors based in Makambako are also responsible for the facilitation and planning of other works in the area.

Makambako was connected by electricity in 1981, however, high installation costs has meant that by 1992, only 2% used electricity for cooking and only 22% had it installed.  The Italian organization, ABB-SAE Sadelmi has erected high-tension power lines and worked on the rehabilitation of the National Grid between Makambako and Mbeya.

In 1992, a piped water supply project received financial and technical assistance from UNICEF, but even after completion, it was considered inadequate, requiring continued potable water dependency on boreholes, dams and streams. Facing an acute problem of water, the Makambako Shallow Wells Project is expected to ease water woes. Organized under the auspices of the GEF/Small Grants Programme, the project started in September 2008 and is expected to be completed in December 2010. Ubena Cultural Reforms Association is the Grantee of the US$36,799 grant.

Tourism
Hotels include:
 Villa Park Hotel
 Mini Villa Park Lodge
 Midtown lodge
 Masemba guest house
 Double masemba guest house
 Jay Jay Highlands Hotel
 The Makambako Lutheran Centre
 Lupyana guest house. 
 DS HOTEL
 Manlucho Resort 
 Maranatha Lodge

References

External links
 

Makambako (former)